The Best Director Award is one of main awards of the Feature Film Competition at the Karlovy Vary International Film Festival. Since 1990, it is conferred on the best director.

Best Director Award winners

References

External links
  The official festival site / History

Karlovy Vary International Film Festival
Czech film awards
International film awards